Kalafungin is a substance discovered in the 1960s and found to act as a broad-spectrum antibiotic in vitro. It was isolated from a strain of the bacterium Streptomyces tanashiensis.

It is not known to be marketed anywhere in the world.

References 

Antibiotics